In spectrophotometry, the Compton edge is a feature of the spectrograph that results from the Compton scattering in the scintillator or detector. When a gamma-ray scatters off the scintillator but escapes, only some fraction of its energy is registered by the detector. The amount of energy deposited in the detector depends on the scattering angle of the photon, leading to a spectrum of energies each corresponding to a different scattering angle. The highest energy that can be deposited, corresponding to full back-scatter, is called the Compton edge. In mathematical terms, the Compton edge is the inflection point of the high-energy side of the Compton region.

Background

In a Compton scattering process, an incident photon collides with an electron in a material. The amount of energy exchanged varies with angle, and is given by the formula:

or

 
 E is the energy of the incident photon.
 E'  is the energy of the outgoing photon, which escapes the material.
  is the mass of the electron.
 c is the speed of light.
  is the angle of deflection for the photon.

The amount of energy transferred to the material varies with the angle of deflection. As  approaches zero, none of the energy is transferred. The maximum amount of energy is transferred when  approaches 180 degrees.

It is impossible for the photon to transfer any more energy via this process; thus, there is a sharp cutoff at this energy, leading to the name Compton edge. If an isotope has multiple photopeaks, each inflection point will have its own Compton edge. 

The region between zero energy transfer and the Compton edge is known as the Compton continuum.

References

See also
 Gamma spectroscopy
 Compton suppression

Spectroscopy